This article lists the premiers or chancellors of British Burma before independence.

Premiers (1937–1948)

See also
 Myanmar
 Politics of Myanmar
 List of colonial governors of Burma
 President of Myanmar
 List of presidents of Myanmar
 State Counsellor of Myanmar
 Vice President of Myanmar
 Lists of office-holders

References

Burma
Premiers